Boyce is a surname. Notable people with the surname include:

 Ann Boyce (1827–1914), New Zealand pioneer and herbalist
 Carla Boyce (born 1998), Scottish footballer
 Cameron Boyce (1999–2019), American actor
 Cameron Boyce (cricketer) (born 1989), Australian cricketer
 Charles Boyce (born 1949), American cartoonist
 Charles Boyce (footballer) (1899–1964), Scottish footballer
 Christopher John Boyce (born 1953), American who sold spy satellite secrets to the USSR
 Darryl Boyce (born 1984), Canadian ice hockey player with the Toronto Marlies of the AHL
 Emmerson Boyce (born 1979), English footballer
 Ethel Boyce, Canadian ballplayer in the All-American Girls Professional Baseball League
 Francis Bertie Boyce "Archbishop Boyce" (1844–1931), Australian social reformer
 Francis Stewart Boyce (1872–1940), his son, Australian politician and judge
 Frank Cottrell-Boyce (born 1959), British writer
 Frank M. Boyce (1851–1931), New York politician
 George Boyce (disambiguation), several people, including
 D. G. Boyce (D. George Boyce, born 1942), Northern Irish historian
 George Boyce (Canadian politician) (1848–1930), Unionist MP for Carleton, 1917–1921
 George Price Boyce (1826–1897), British watercolor painter
 George W. G. Boyce Jr. (died 1944), United States Army officer and Medal of Honor recipient
 James Boyce (disambiguation), several people including:
 James Boyce (Louisiana politician) (1922–1990), American politician 
 James F. Boyce (1868–1935), American industrial chemist
 James Petigru Boyce (1827–1888), theologian and Southern Seminary founder
 Kevin Boyce (born 1971), American politician, Ohio State Treasurer
 Lola Boyce, American mechanical engineer
 Mary Boyce (1920–2006), British scholar of Iranian languages and authority on Zoroastrianism
 Mary Cunningham Boyce, American academic and engineer
 Martin Boyce, Scottish sculptor
 Max Boyce (born 1943), Welsh singer and comedian
 Michael Boyce (disambiguation), several people:
 Michael Boyce (field hockey) (born 1980), Australian field hockey player
 Michael Boyce, Baron Boyce (born 1943), First Sea Lord of the Royal Navy and Chief of Defence Staff
 Minnie Thomas Boyce (1870-1929), American writer
 Philip Boyce (disambiguation), several people
 Raymond Boyce (disambiguation), several people
 Samuel Boyce (died 1775), dramatist and poet
 Sue Boyce (born 1951), Australian politician, businesswoman and disability advocate
 Todd Boyce (born 1961), Anglo-American actor
 Tommy Boyce (1939–1994), of the American songwriters Boyce and Hart
 William Boyce (disambiguation), several people, including:
 William Boyce (composer) (1711–1779), English-born composer and Master of the King's Musick
 William Binnington Boyce (1804–1889), English-born philologist and clergyman, active in Australia
 William D. Boyce (1858–1929), founder of the Boy Scouts of America
 William H. Boyce (1855–1942), jurist and U.S. representative from Delaware
 William Waters Boyce (1818–1890), U.S. Confederate congressional delegate

See also
Boice, surname

English-language surnames